Martin Chren (born 8 May 1999) is a Slovak cyclist, who currently rides for UCI Continental team . He competed in the scratch and the points race at the 2021 UCI Track Cycling World Championships and 2022 UCI Track Cycling World Championships.

Major results

Track

2018
 National Track Championships
1st  Individual pursuit
2nd  Kilometer
3rd  Madison
2019
 National Track Championships
1st  Points race
1st  Omnium
1st  Scratch
1st  Kilometer
2020
 National Track Championships
2nd  Scratch
2nd  Kilometer
2nd  Elimination race
2021
 National Track Championships
1st  Points race 
2nd Omnium 
3rd Scratch
 1st Scratch, GP Framar
 2nd Scratch, GP Prostejov
2022
 1st Scratch, Athens Track Grand Prix
 National Track Championships
1st  Points race
1st  Omnium
1st  Scratch
1st  Individual pursuit
1st  Elimination

Road
2020
 5th Time trial, National Under-23 Road Championships
2021
 4th Road race, National Under-23 Road Championships

References

External links

1999 births
Living people
Slovak male cyclists
Slovak track cyclists
European Games competitors for Slovakia
Cyclists at the 2019 European Games